The Great Plains Conservation Program (GPCP), initiated in 1957, provided cost share and technical assistance to apply conservation on entire farms in 10 Great Plains states from the Dakotas and Montana to Texas and New Mexico. Contracts were limited to $35,000. It was replaced by the Environmental Quality Incentives Program (EQIP) in the 1996 farm bill (P.L. 104-127).

References 

United States Department of Agriculture
Nature conservation organizations based in the United States